Fabrizio Caracciolo Piscizi or Modernus Caracciolo Piscizi (1583–1631) was a Roman Catholic prelate who served as Bishop of Oppido Mamertina (1630–1631),
Bishop of Catanzaro (1609–1629), and Apostolic Collector to Portugal (1604–1609).

Biography
Fabrizio Caracciolo Piscizi was born in Naples, Italy in 1583.
On 22 December 1604, he was appointed during the papacy of Pope Clement VIII as Apostolic Collector to Portugal. 
He resigned as Apostolic Collector to Portugal on 30 January 1609. 
On 7 January 1619, he was appointed during the papacy of Pope Paul V as Bishop of Catanzaro.
In February 1619, he was consecrated bishop by Decio Carafa, Archbishop of Naples.  
He resigned as Bishop of Catanzaro on 7 November 1629. 
On 28 January 1630, he was appointed during the papacy of Pope Urban VIII as Bishop of Oppido Mamertina. 
He served as Bishop of Catanzaro until his death in 1631.
 
While bishop, he was the principal co-consecrator of Fabio Olivadisi, Bishop of Lavello (1626); and Gerolamo Cappello, Bishop of Termoli (1626).

References

External links and additional sources
 (for Chronology of Bishops) 
 (for Chronology of Bishops) 
 (for Chronology of Bishops) 
 (for Chronology of Bishops) 
 (for Chronology of Bishops) 

17th-century Italian Roman Catholic bishops
Bishops appointed by Pope Clement VIII
Bishops appointed by Pope Paul V
Bishops appointed by Pope Urban VIII
1583 births
1631 deaths